Vinzenz Kiefer (born January 29, 1979) is a German actor. He is known for playing the role of police detective Alexander Brandt in the crime series Alarm für Cobra 11, Christian Dassault in Jason Bourne, as well as playing Peter-Jürgen Boock in the The Baader Meinhof Complex. His older sister Dorkas Kiefer is an actress. 

Vinzenz Kiefer also played a main role as a German tank commander, named Klaus Jäger, in the Russian WW2 film T-34 (2019).

In the RTL action series Alarm for Cobra 11 Vinzenz Kiefer was seen in the episode Revolution (episode 261, German first broadcast of March 27, 2014) for the first time the role of Chief Commissioner Alex Brandt, replacing his predecessor Tom Beck (in his role as chief commissioner Ben Jäger). With the episode Windspiel (episode 291, German first broadcast of November 5, 2015), the role of Alex Brandt dropped out of the series, surprisingly. The broadcaster justified this with a change of direction of the format, the narrative arc of the serious role of Alex Brandt was exhausted and there would be on the part of the audience the desire for more humor. Kiefer was in front of the camera for the series from July 2013 to July 2015. Since September 2016 he has been married to actress Masha Tokareva.

References

Content in this edit is translated from the existing German Wikipedia article at :de:Vinzenz Kiefer; see its history for attribution.

External links

1979 births
Living people
German male television actors
German male film actors
People from Weilburg
21st-century German people